Goodradigbee Shire was a local government area in the Southern Tablelands region of New South Wales, Australia.

The Shire was established in 1906 and its offices were based in the town of Yass. In 1975 Goodradigbee Shire was merged with the Municipality of Yass to form Yass Shire.

References

Former local government areas of New South Wales
1906 establishments in Australia
1980 disestablishments in Australia